Charlie Falzon is a Canadian retired soccer player who spent time in the North American Soccer League and Major Indoor Soccer League.  He also earned nine caps with the Canadian national soccer team between 1983 and 1989.  Charlie is currently an advanced care paramedic working for Toronto EMS.

Professional
A midfielder, Falzon played the last 3 seasons of the NASL before the league's demise - the 1982 with the Montreal Manic and 1983 and '84 with the Toronto Blizzard.  In September 1985, Falzon signed as a free agent with the Pittsburgh Spirit of the original Major Indoor Soccer League.  In 1986, he moved to the St. Louis Steamers.  In December 1987, the Steamers traded Falzon to the Tacoma Stars in exchange for Godfrey Ingram and cash. Falzon also played for the North York Rockets and Toronto Blizzard in the Canadian Soccer League.

National team
Falzon earned nine caps with the Canadian national soccer team.  He played three times in 1983 and another three gamed in 1984.  After two games in 1988, he finished his career with a single game against Belgium in 1989.  He scored no goals with the national team.

Coach
Falzon has been involved with the Ontario Soccer Association, being an assistant coach of the OSA's U-14 boys team. Falzon is also involved as a coach with a girls Select soccer team at the North Mississauga Soccer Club.

References

External links
 NASL/MISL stats
 
 

Soccer players from Toronto
Association football midfielders
Canadian expatriate sportspeople in the United States
Canadian expatriate soccer players
Canada men's international soccer players
Canadian people of Maltese descent
Canadian soccer players
Expatriate soccer players in the United States
Major Indoor Soccer League (1978–1992) players
Montreal Manic players
North American Soccer League (1968–1984) indoor players
North American Soccer League (1968–1984) players
Pittsburgh Spirit players
St. Louis Steamers (original MISL) players
Tacoma Stars players
Toronto Blizzard (1971–1984) players
North York Rockets players
Toronto Blizzard (1986–1993) players
Canadian Soccer League (1987–1992) players
1961 births
Living people